Sorkh Geriveh (also Romanized as Sorkh Gerīveh; also known as Sorkh Chārī, Sorkh Geryeh, and Surkhchari) is a village in Shohada Rural District, Yaneh Sar District, Behshahr County, Mazandaran Province, Iran. At the 2006 census, its population was 342, in 98 families.

References 

Populated places in Behshahr County